Solar-powered sea slugs may refer to two groups of marine opisthobranch gastropods that are able to use photosynthesis as a supplementary nutritional source:

 Sacoglossa, which incorporate functioning chloroplasts into their tissues using kleptoplasty
 Species of aeolid nudibranchs in the genera Phyllodesmium and Pteraeolidia, which incorporate living zooxanthellae in their tissues

Animal common name disambiguation pages